Combretum paniculatum, the burning bush or forest flame-creeper, is a plant species in the genus Combretum found in Africa. The fruit is a samara, i.e. a winged seed.

Chemistry 

The ethyl acetate extract of the leaf shows the presence of phenolic compounds (flavonoids, coumarins and tannins), sterols and alkaloids.

It produces a gum that is not recommended for food applications.

References

External links 

 
 www.zimbabweflora.co.zw

paniculatum
Plants described in 1808